Jason Young (born 1 March 1972) is a Scottish former footballer who played as a forward for Stranraer and Livingston.

Career

Youth
Young came through the youth academies of Salvesen Boys Club and Hearts. He spent three seasons at Tynecastle Park but left the club without making a single first team appearance.Jason played for Hearts in the 1991 soccer sixes squad that won the title in 1991 beating Motherwell in the final.Jason also played for Scotland school boys under 16’s team

Senior
The striker signed for Meadowbank Thistle in 1991 and enjoyed two seasons in Edinburgh before making a move to VfB Wissen in Germany in the third tier. There he spent another two seasons, but failed to become a regular starter in the side.

Young returned to Scotland in January 1995 and re-signed with Meadowbank Thistle. He was to go on to write his name into the history books when his side moved to the new town of Livingston in 1995: Young scored Livingston's first ever goal, in a 2–0 Scottish League Cup win over Montrose at Links Park on 5 August 1995.Also he scored a famous first ever goal at the following week at the almondvale stadium in a win versus East Sterling in front of a full capacity crowd    . Also he won the prestigious award of third division player of the year voted by his fellow professionals in his prolific goal scoring season with 21 goals.

After Livi were bought by new owners with a big investment, Young found himself out of the team and soon moved to Stranraer. He made 38 appearances for the Blues and scored 3 goals, including a memorable goal against Hibernian in August 1998.

Young finished his career with spells at Bonnyrigg Rose and Penicuik Athletic before retiring from playing in 2006.

Personal life
Jason is the son of former Hearts player Alex Young.

References

External links
Jason Young on Soccerbase

1972 births
Living people
Scottish footballers
Scottish Football League players
Association football forwards
Livingston F.C. players
Stranraer F.C. players
Heart of Midlothian F.C. players
VfB Wissen players
Bonnyrigg Rose Athletic F.C. players
Penicuik Athletic F.C. players
Footballers from Edinburgh
Scottish Junior Football Association players
Scottish expatriate footballers
Scottish expatriate sportspeople in Germany
Expatriate footballers in Germany